Hua Lamphong is the common colloquial name of the Bangkok railway station. The name may also refer to:

Hua Lamphong Station, the historical terminus of the Paknam Railway
Hua Lamphong MRT station, an underground station of the Bangkok MRT
Hua Lamphong Road and Hua Lamphong Canal, historical names of Rama IV Road and the canal whose course it now occupies
Wat Hua Lamphong, a Buddhist temple